Dean Martin Sings is the first studio album by Italian-American singer Dean Martin, released in 1953. It is the first long-play 10-inch album recorded by Martin for Capitol Records during two sessions recorded on the evening of November 20, 1952. The first session was recorded between 5 and 8 PM and it produced five songs featuring string arrangements. "There's My Lover" was recorded but not released. After a 90-minute break, Martin was joined by a brass arrangement to record the remaining four songs. Seven of the eight songs on this album appeared in the Martin & Lewis film, The Stooge. Two years later, the songs from this 10-inch album would be combined with four newly popular songs recorded between 1951 and 1953 to create a full-length 12-inch album. The 2005 Collectors' Choice reissue added four bonus songs recorded between 1949 and 1953 and was released with alternative cover artwork.

Track listing

10-inch Long Play
Capitol H-401

Side A

Side B

12-inch Long Play
Capitol T 401

Side A

Side B

Compact Disc
2005 Collectors' Choice Music CD Catalog Number WWCCM05982 
The 12-tracks of 2nd LP Plus:

"You're the Right One" (Sammy Gallop / Howard Steiner) Time: 3:09. Session 3098; Master 11695-5. Recorded August 13, 1953.
"Blue Smoke (Kohu Auwahi)" (Ruru Karaitiana) Time: 2:26. Session 2382; Master 9292-9. Recorded November 5, 1951.
"Johnny, Get Your Girl" (Vic Mizzy / Mann Curtis) Time: 2:33. Session 1172A; Master 3907-2. Recorded January 26, 1949.
"As You Are" (Billy Friedman / Herbert L. Miller) Time: 3:05. Session 2382; Master 9282-7. Recorded November 5, 1951.

Personnel
Dean Martin: Vocals
Dick Stabile: Leader
Vincent Terri: Guitar
Norman V. Seelig: Bass
Ray S. Toland: Drums, Contractor
Louis Brown: Piano
Armond Kaproff: Cello (Session 2827)
Elias Friede: Cello (Session 2827)
Helen Bliss: Harp (Session 2827)
Louis Kievman: Viola (Session 2827)
Reuben Marcus: Viola (Session 2827)
John Augustine: Violin (Session 2827)
Victor Bay: Violin (Session 2827)
John Peter DeVoogt: Violin (Session 2827)
Nicholas 'Nick' Pisani: Violin (Session 2827)
Joseph G. Quadri: Violin (Session 2827)
Mischa Russell: Violin (Session 2827)
Jules Jacob: Saxophone (Session 2828)
Robert Lawson: Saxophone (Session 2828)
Theodore M 'Ted' Nash: Saxophone (Session 2828)
Edward 'Ed' Rosa: Saxophone (Session 2828)
Ray Heath: Trombone (Session 2828)
Eddie Kuczborski 'Eddie' Kusby: Trombone (Session 2828)
Paul O.W. Tanner: Trombone (Session 2828)
Conrad Gozzo: Trumpet (Session 2828)
Joe Dolney: Trumpet (Session 2828)
James Rosselli: Trumpet (Session 2828)

Dean Martin Sings
Dean Martin Sings
Capitol Records albums